Hydrovatus sinister, is a species of predaceous diving beetle found in India, Myanmar, Sri Lanka, Sumatra, Thailand, Laos, Singapore and Malaysia.

The beetle is commonly inhabited in shallow, muddy water of open swamps, artificial ponds such as garden ponds, park ponds, quarry ponds, and slowly flowing irrigation ditches. The area is rich in rotten leaves, sedges and submerged plants.

References 

Dytiscidae
Insects of Sri Lanka
Insects described in 1890